The Botorrita plaques are four bronze plaques discovered in  Botorrita (Roman Contrebia Belaisca), near Zaragoza, Spain, dating to the late 2nd century BC, known as Botorrita I, II, III and IV.

Botorrita II is in the Latin language, but Botorrita I, III and IV, inscribed in the Celtiberian script, constitute the main part of the Celtiberian corpus.

Botorrita I
Botorrita I was found in 1970. It is the longest inscription in Celtiberian consisting of a text in 11 lines, on the front face, continued by a list of names on the back side.
A.1. 
A.2. 
A.3. 
A.4. 
A.5. 
A.6. 
A.7. 
A.8. 
A.9. 
A.10. 
A.11. 
B.1. 
B.2. 
B.3. 
B.4. 
B.5. 
B.6. 
B.7. 
B.8. 
B.9.

Translation

Although the general contents of the inscription are known with some confidence--apparently a set of prohibitions ( "must neither...nor..." A.2) with specifications of punishments (including payment in silver =  A.3) for violations (side A), and a list of guarantors on side B (though the list seems to start at the end of A.11 with )--there is as yet no unified, agreed-upon translation. It is still not clear, for example, whether the text presents sacred laws concerning a temple or municipal regulations.

On the first side, David Stifter (2001), for example, indicates that <> is an 'assembly of 300', similar to Gaulish , while <> according to Bayer (1994) it means something like 'was (deemed) suitable (by the assembly)' (cf. Latin  'to please').

For  in lines A.2-3, Prosper (2006) translates:  "[all] this (is) valid by order of the competent authority" based on the following analyses: : [all] this (< *sod); : final, valid (< *h₂eug-os 'strong, valid', cf. Latin augustus 'solemn'); : of the competent authority (gen. sing.  < *pr̥Hi-steh₂-lo 'competent authority' < *pr̥Hi-sto 'what is first, authority'); : by order (instrumental fem. sing. < *dʰoh₁m-eh₂ 'establish, dispose'). 

For  (A.8-9), Jordán (2004) translates: "of these, he will give the tithe/tax inside of this territory, so [may it] be fenced as [it should] be unfenced" based on the following analyses:  "of these" (< *sa-ōm);  "the tithes, the tax";  "he will pay, will give";  "inside, in" (< *h₁en-i); : of this (loc. sing. < *so-sm-ei 'from this');  "territory" (loc. sing. < *touzom 'territory' < *tewt-yo); : "so (be) fenced"; : "as (be) unfenced."

The second side clearly consists of names, presumably prominent members of the assembly. The names are in the Celtiberian formula, e.g. , that is 'Lubo of the Kounesiko (people), [son] of Melnon'; for this reason, it has been suggested that <> is actually <>, i.e. // 'son', as this clearly fits the context (seen notes on plaque III below), but it may merely be a title of a kind of magistrate. It is generally agreed that  in A.5 means "path," a form also seen in Gaulish, borrowed into Late Latin as cammīnus, and from there into the modern Romance languages.

Botorrita II

This bronze plaque, also known as Tabula Contrebiensis, is inscribed in Latin and was discovered in an illegal excavation of the Contrebia Belaisca site, and was obtained in December 1979 by editor Guillermo Fatás Cabeza.  The inscription is fully decipherable and relates how the senate of Contrebia Belaisca was called upon by neighboring towns for a decision concerning the right of the town of Salluia to build a canal through the territory of the Sosinestani, an initiative to which the neighboring Allauonenses objected.  Based upon the names of Roman officials, the text has been dated to May 87 BC. English translation available at: https://droitromain.univ-grenoble-alpes.fr/Anglica/Contrebiensis_Richardson.htm

1. 
2. 
3. 
4. 
5. 

6. 
7. 
8. 
9. 
10. 
11. 

12. 
13. 
14. 

15. 
16. 
17. 
18. 
19. 
20.

Summary
Based on Richardson (1983).

The present members of the Contrebian senate are to judge whether the Sosilestani have the right to sell their land to the Salluenses who plan to build a canal on it, against the wishes of the neighboring Allavonenses. 

Specifically, the appointed judges are to determine whether by Sosilestani's own laws it is permissible for them to sell the land for building a canal through private land, already staked out for this purpose by the Salluenses, if the latter pay for it appropriately.

If they judge in favor of the sale, then the Contrebian magistracy will pick five men to arbitrate the sale, and Roman commander C. V. Flaccus will support the judgment. 

The decision falls in favor of the Salluenses. (There follows a list of the names of the Contrebian magistrates in power at the time.)

Botorrita III
Botorrita III, discovered in 1979, is inscribed in four columns on one side of a plaque, introduced by a heading of two lines. A part of the plaque is missing, but the inscribed portion is complete. It is heavily corroded, and the text was only legible by x-ray.

01: 
02:

Translation
Basically this is a list of names, mostly following the formula seen on the first plaque: name plus tribal name in -um (probably genitive pl). In the mostly obscure first two lines (=title?), the form soium seems to be a close parallel to the Sanskrit genitive plural pronominal form teśam < *toisom "of them". If Lambert is correct in his determination that eskeninum is a genitive plural agreeing with the pronoun, and from *eks- plus the cognate of Latin genuinus, and that alba is a borrowing from Latin in the meaning "public list of names" (originally written on a white board), a partial translation of the second line might be: "...[this is] the public list of the names of those very authentic [authorities/individuals]..." Whether the list involved legal claims (like Botorrita II above) or had a religious or some other purpose remains, however, unclear. It is notable and rare for this region in this time period for such a public list to include so many female names and references--apparently nearly 30. 

In 3.25 and 3.58, launi may mean "spouse", both times followed by -kue, so "and [his] wife"; it also occurs in local fragmentary epigraphy. Similarly, kentis (2.3, 2.25, 3.4, 3.56, 4.3) "son" is also followed by -kue "and [his] son," and tuate.es-kue (2.40) likely means "and [his] daughter(s?)". The two-line multiple genitives in 3.23-3.24 are unique in the text: retukeno : elkueikikum / kentisum : tuateros-kue "of the sons and of the daughter of the Re(x)-tugenoi ("children of king(s)"?), the Elkueikikoi ("those with horses that have wheels/chariots" if from *ekue-kykloi)."

These suggest that akuia (1.42), munika (1.53, also 2.51), litu (1.57), elkua (2.51), ama (3.55; also amu 1.56?), koitana (3.5, also 1.4, 1.6, 2.15), turtunta (3.38), and abalos (3.47) may also express some relationship, since they fall in the same positions followed by -kue (though some or all may simply be names as well).

The names kalaitos in 2.33, 4.5, 4.12 and tur(r)o (1.60, 2.67 and as elements in many other names, probably "bull") are also found frequently carved in cave walls in the area. The form burzu (1.23, 1.33...) may be connected to the ancient name for a town about 30 miles north of Botorrita: Bruzau.The element <mel-> in 1.18, 3.3, 4.3...may be from the proto-Celtic root *mello "hill", perhaps as part of a place name.

Xavier Delamarre and John T. Koch argue that the term uiroku (< *wiro-kū) in 1.5, 1.51 and 3.26 means 'man-dog' (i.e. werewolf). It would be cognate to Viroconium (< *wiroconion, 'place of man-dogs'), the ancient name of the English village of Wroxeter, the Old Irish ferchu ('male dog, fierce dog'), and the Brittonic personal names Guurci (Old Welsh) and Gurki (Old Breton).

Blanca María Prósper interprets the word letontu as pertaining to the semantic field of Proto-Indo-European *pléth₂us ('flat, vast, broad'). It is also suggested that Toutinokum refers to a family name and derives from the widespread Celtic (and Indo-European) stem *teut/tout- ('people, tribe').

Jürgen Untermann notes that some of the names may be of Latin origin: markos (3.43), titos (2.9), lukinos , balakos . sekonzos (4.18) = Flaccus Secundus, bolora = Flora, bubilibor = Publipor; while others may be of Greek origin: antiokos (4.13) = Antiochus, bilonikos Philonicus, tais (2.31) Thais. Note that in 3.15, the name Secundus seems to be spelled sekontios, suggesting that the palatalization of medial /d/ to <z> was still in progress. Names with claimed Iberian elements include biurtilaur (1.37), anieskor (4.27), bilosban (4.34), and bartiltun : ekarbilos (2.50), karbilikum (3.39). In 1.55, kortikos may mean "public," and kontusos (1.2) may either refer to a group of clients under patronage of someone, or a group of slaves.

Botorrita IV
Botorrita IV, discovered in 1994, consists of 18 lines on both faces of the plaque. The text is fragmentary.
A.1. [...]tam:tirikantam:entorkue:toutam[...]
A.2. [...]:sua kombal[.]z:bouitos:ozeum:[...]
A.3. [...]i:turuntas:tirikantos:kustai:bize[...]
A.4. [...]a:karalom:aranti:otenei:ambi[...]
A.5. [...]kom:atibion:taskue:.a.s[...]
A.6. [...]kue:usimounei:[...]
A.7. [...]karalom:ios:lu.e.s[...]
A.8. [...]oi.u..ti:esta[...]
A.9. [...]uta:...kue[...]
A.10. [...]ti.. n.e[...]
B.1. [...]e .. i[...]
B.2. [...]atuz:uta:e[...]
B.3. [...]isum:..ti:[...]
B.4. [...]olo...:iom:u[...]
B.5. [...]toke...ta:.ue:tizatuz[...]
B.6. [...]l..lez.l.toioan[...]
B.7. [...]toruonti:stoteroi:tas[...]
B.8. [...]ko..esusiomo..o[...]

References

Further reading 

 Bayer, Walter (1994) "Zur Inschrift von Botorrita: keltiberisch bintiś, kombalkes, kombalkoŕeś, aleiteś und ikueś". In: Etudes Celtiques. vol. 30 pp. 191-203. DOI: https://doi.org/10.3406/ecelt.1994.2040
 Beltrán, A. y A. Tovar (1982) Contrebia Belaisca (Botorrita, Zaragoza). I. El bronce con alfabeto ‘ibérico’ de Botorrita, Zaragoza.
 Beltrán, A. (19830 “Epigrafía ibérica de Contrebia Belaisca (Botorrita, Zaragoza): inscripciones menores”, en Homenaje al prof. Martín Almagro Basch. III, Madrid, pp. 99-107.
 Beltrán Lloris, Francisco (1996): «Useisu aiankum tauro no era bintis. Una nota de lectura sobre la cara B de Botorrita 1»,  La Hispania prerromana, pp. 51–63.
 Beltrán Lloris, Francisco (2002): (Review of F. Villar, Mª. A. Díaz, M. Mª. Medrano y C. Jordán, El IV bronce de Botorrita (Contrebia Belaisca): arqueología y lingüística, Ediciones Universidad de Salamanca, Salamanca 2001, 226 pp.) in Palaeohispanica (revista sobre lengua y culturas de la Hispania antigua), vol. 2, Zaragoza, pp. 381–393. .
 Beltrán Lloris, Francisco - de Hoz, Javier - Untermann, Jürgen (1996): El tercer bronce de Botorrita (Contrebia Belaisca), Zaragoza.
 Francisco Beltrán Lloris and Carlos Jordán Cólera (2020) "Celtiberian" PALAEOHISPANICA: revista sobre lenguas y culturas de la Hispania antigua pp. 631-690. I.S.S.N. 1578-5386 DOI: 10.36707/palaeohispanica.v0i20.395
 Bernardo Stempel, Patrizia de. "Il celtibérico Pi.n.Ti.ś come antico composto indoeuropeo". In: Etudes Celtiques. vol. 32, 1996. pp. 117-124. DOI: https://doi.org/10.3406/ecelt.1996.2090
 De Bernardo, Patrizia (2009) "La Gramática Celtibérica Del Primer Bronce De Botorrita: Nuevos Resultados" In Acta Palaeohispanica X. Palaeohispanica 9  p. 694. 
 Eichner, Heiner (1989) "Damals und heute: Probleme der Erschliessung des Altkentischen zu Zeussens Zeit und in der Gegenwart" in Erlanger Gedenkfeier für Johann Kasper Zeuss (ed. B. Forssman) Erlangen p. 45 ff.
 Eska, Joseph F. (1988) Towards an interpretation of the Hispano-Celtic inscription of BotorritaUniversity of Toronto (Canada) ProQuest Dissertations Publishing NL43452.
 Jordán, Carlos (2004): Celtibérico, Zaragoza.
 Lambert, Pierre-Yves (1996) (review of Beltran, Hoz and Untermann, 1996) Études celtiques 32  pp. 268-274.https://www.persee.fr/doc/ecelt_0373-1928_1996_num_32_1_2261_t1_0268_0000_3.
 Lambert, Pierre-Yves (2012) (Review of Prósper, Blanca María  El bronce celtibérico de Botorrita I. Pisa-Roma, Fabrizio Serra editore, 2008 (Ricerche sulle lingue di frammentaria attestazione, 6) ) in Études celtiques 38  pp. 301-302.
 Lejeune, Michel (1973) "La grande inscription celtibère de Botorrita", Comptes rendus des séances de l'Académie des Inscriptions et Belles-Lettres pp. 622-648. https://www.persee.fr/doc/crai_0065-0536_1973_num_117_4_12946
 Lejeune, Michel (1990) (Review of Eska, Joseph F. (1988) Towards an interpretation of the Hispano-Celtic inscription of BotorritaUniversity of Toronto (Canada) ProQuest Dissertations Publishing NL43452.) Études celtiques 27  pp. 380-381.
 Meid, Wolfgang (1993) Die erste Botorrita-Inschrift: Interpretation eines keltiberischen Sprachdenkmals. Institut für Sprachwissenschaften der Universität, Innsbruck  (Innsbrucker Beiträge zur Sprachwissenschaft; Band 76).
 Prósper, Blanca María  El bronce celtibérico de Botorrita I. Pisa-Roma, Fabrizio Serra editore, 2008 (Ricerche sulle lingue di frammentaria attestazione, 6)
 Richardson, J. S. (1983) "The Tabula Contrebiensis: Roman Law in Spain in the Early First Century B.C." The Journal of Roman Studies, Vol. 73 , pp. 33-41 https://doi.org/10.2307/300071.
 Rodríguez Adrados, Francisco. "Propuestas para la interpretación de Botorrita I". In: Emerita: Revista de lingüística y filología clásica. Vol. 63. Nº 1. 1995. pags. 1-16.  
 Rodríguez Adrados, Francisco. "Sobre Botorrita IV". In: Emerita. Revista de Lingüística y Filología Clásica (EM). LXX. Vol. 1. 2002. pp. 1-8.
 Schmidt, Karl Horst (Jan 1, 1992) (Review of Eska) Indogermanische Forschungen; Strassburg Vol. 97 pp. 236-242.
 Simón Cornago, Ignacio. "Note de lecture sur une brève inscription de Botorrita (Contrebia Belaisca)." In: Etudes Celtiques, vol. 41, 2015. pp. 59-74. DOI: https://doi.org/10.3406/ecelt.2015.2449
 Stifter, David (2001): "Neues vom Keltiberischen: Notizen zu Botorrita IV", Die Sprache (Sonderheft): Chronicalia Indoeuropaea 38/3 [1996], pp. 89–110.
 Stifter, David (2006): "Contributions to Celtiberian Etymology 2", Palaeohispanica 6, pp. 237–245.
 Untermann, Jürgen (1997): Monumenta Linguarum Hispanicarum. IV Die tartessischen, keltiberischen und lusitanischen Inschriften, Wiesbaden.
 Velaza, Javier (1999): «Balance actual de la onomástica personal celtibérica», Pueblos, lenguas y escrituras en la Hispania Prerromana, pp. 663–683.
 Villar, Francisco - Díaz, Mª Antonia - Medrano, Manuel Mª - Jordán, Carlos (2001): El IV bronce de Botorrita (Contrebia Belaisca): arqueología y lingüística, Salamanca.

Paleohispanic languages
Archaeological discoveries in Spain
Celtiberian inscriptions
Bronze objects
Province of Zaragoza
History of Aragon
20th-century archaeological discoveries
Latin inscriptions
2nd century BC in Hispania